The National Weather Service Caribou, Maine is a local office of the National Weather Service responsible for monitoring weather conditions in northern Maine. It is co-located with an upper air sounding facility but the NEXRAD radar KCBW is near Houlton, Maine, further south.

Mission 

The National Weather Service in Caribou provides weather, hydrologic, and climate forecasts and warnings for northeastern Maine, and adjacent waters for the protection of life and property and the enhancement of the national economy.

NOAA Weather Radio
National Weather Service Caribou, Maine forecast office provides programming for eight NOAA Weather Radio stations in Maine.

References

External links
 NWS Caribou's website

Caribou, Maine
Aroostook County, Maine